Colin Michael Bonner (born May 1, 1994) is a retired American soccer player.

Career

College and amateur
Bonner played college soccer at the University of North Carolina at Wilmington between 2012 and 2015.

In 2015, Bonner played with Premier Development League side D.C. United U-23.

Professional
FC Dallas selected Bonner in the third round (45th overall) of the 2016 MLS SuperDraft. He was loaned to United Soccer League side Oklahoma City Energy and made his professional debut on May 1, 2016, in a 1-1 draw against Seattle Sounders FC 2. Before his second season, Bonner decided to retire from professional soccer.

Honors

Club

FC Dallas 

 Lamar Hunt U.S. Open Cup (1): 2016
 Supporters' Shield (1): 2016

References

External links
 

1994 births
Living people
American soccer players
Association football forwards
D.C. United U-23 players
FC Dallas draft picks
FC Dallas players
Major League Soccer players
OKC Energy FC players
People from Fulton, Maryland
Soccer players from Maryland
Sportspeople from the Baltimore metropolitan area
UNC Wilmington Seahawks men's soccer players
USL Championship players
USL League Two players